The Tokyo Kinen (in Japanese: 東京記念), is a horse race for three-years-old and over at Ohi Racecourse.

Race details

The name of the race has its origins with the 1964 Tokyo Olympics, and its original name was the "Tokyo Olympics Kinen".

The race is 2,400 meters long and is run on dirt. All editions of the race took place at Ohi Racecourse.

The race has always been held in the fall, with it originally being held in October or November, but now it is held in September.

Winners since 2015

Winners since 2015 include

Past winners

Past winners include:

See also
 Horse racing in Japan
 List of Japanese flat horse races

References

Horse races in Japan